Anirudha Dipa (1 July 1930 - 7 April 1990) was  an Indian politician. He was elected to the Lok Sabha, the lower house of the Parliament of India as a member of the Swatantra Party.

References

External links
Official biographical sketch in Parliament of India website

1930 births
Lok Sabha members from Odisha
Swatantra Party politicians
1990 deaths